Mark Kistler's Imagination Station is a public television series where artist Mark Kistler taught children and adults to draw using techniques such as perspective and shading. The program was originally presented by TV station KIXE in the Redding and Chico areas of the U.S. state of California. Kistler also released some publications of teaching techniques used in the show. It had a short reprise later in the 1990s but did not continue to run past a few episodes.

The show ran for 65 episodes, starting on October 14, 1991 to July 10, 1998, and after cancellation, reruns aired until August 6, 1999. In the summer of 2009 Kistler filmed additional shows that began airing on PBS in the fall of 2009.

References

1991 American television series debuts
1998 American television series endings
1990s American children's television series
American children's education television series
Arts and crafts television series
PBS Kids shows
PBS original programming